Dimitri Sartison (born 4 February 1980) is a German former professional boxer who competed from 2003 to 2013, and held the WBA super-middleweight title from 2009 to 2011.

External links

1980 births
Living people
Sportspeople from Hamburg
German male boxers
World super-middleweight boxing champions
World Boxing Association champions
German people of Kazakhstani descent